The Mistago River is a tributary of the Barlow River (Chibougamau River), flowing into the Regional County Municipality (MRC) of Eeyou Istchee Baie-James, in Jamésie, in the administrative region of Nord-du-Québec, in the province of Quebec, at Canada.

The course of the river flows into Plamondon Township, Richardson Township and Blaiklock Township. This river flows into the Mistissini (Cree village municipality), into the Albanel Lakes Wildlife Reserve, Mistassini and Mistago and into the Assinica Wildlife Sanctuary.

The hydrographic slope of the Mistago River is accessible by a forest road (North-South direction) which cuts the river and connects to route 167 south-west of Waconichi Lake; the latter road comes from Chibougamau, going north-east along the southeast shore of Waconichi Lake and the river of the same name.

The surface of the "Mistago River" is usually frozen from early November to mid-May, however traffic Ice safety is usually from mid-November to mid-April.

Geography

Toponymy 
Of Cree origin, this hydronym means "the White River".

The toponym "Mistago River" was formalized on December 5, 1968, at the Commission de toponymie du Québec, that is to say, the foundation of this commission.

References

See also 

Rivers of Nord-du-Québec
Nottaway River drainage basin